Khitan scripts may refer to one of two mutually exclusive scripts used by the Khitan people during the 10th–12th centuries:

Khitan small script, invented in about 924 or 925 CE by a scholar named Diela
Khitan large script, introduced in 920 CE by Abaoji, founder of the Liao Dynasty

See also
 List of Khitan inscriptions

Undeciphered writing systems